The Uppudaluwa Wind Farm (also known as PowerGen Lanka Wind Farm, after its developers) is a  wind farm owned by  in Uppudaluwa, Puttalam, Sri Lanka.

The plant is estimated to generate  annually.

Wind turbines 

See also 

 Electricity in Sri Lanka
 List of power stations in Sri Lanka

References

External links 

 

Wind farms in Sri Lanka
Buildings and structures in Puttalam District